Maurice Anderson  (born January 19, 1975) is a former American football lineman who played two seasons in the Arena Football League (AFL) with the Colorado Crush and Los Angeles Avengers. He played college football at the University of Virginia. He was also a member of the New York Jets, New England Patriots and Miami Dolphins of the National Football League (NFL). He also played for the Amsterdam Admirals of NFL Europe. He was a member of the New England Patriots team that won Super Bowl XXXVI.

Early years
Anderson played defensive end at Nottoway High School in Nottoway County, Virginia and was named all-state and all-region in his junior and senior years.

College career
Anderson was a four-year letterman for the Virginia Cavaliers of the University of Virginia. He finished his career with 106 tackles and five sacks.

Professional career

New England Patriots
Anderson was signed by the New England Patriots as a rookie free agent on April 25, 2000. He was released by the Patriots on August 28, 2000.

New York Jets
Anderson was claimed off waivers by the New York Jets on August 29, 2000. He was re-signed to a one-year deal by the Jets on March 27, 2001. He was released by the Jets on September 3, 2001.

New England Patriots
Anderson was signed to the Patriots practice squad on October 16, 2001. He was re-signed on February 11, 2002. He was released by the Patriots on September 1, 2002 and signed to the Patriots' practice squad on September 3. Anderson was on the practice squad when the Patriots won Super Bowl XXXVI.

Miami Dolphins
Anderson was signed by the Miami Dolphins on January 28, 2003.

Amsterdam Admirals
Anderson was allocated to NFL Europe by the Miami Dolphins on January 31, 2003. He played for the Amsterdam Admirals. He was released by the Dolphins on August 29, 2003.

Colorado Crush
Anderson spent the 2005 season with the Colorado Crush.

Los Angeles Avengers
Anderson spent the 2006 season with the Los Angeles Avengers.

References

External links
Just Sports Stats

Living people
1975 births
American football defensive tackles
American football offensive linemen
African-American players of American football
Virginia Cavaliers football players
Amsterdam Admirals players
Colorado Crush players
Los Angeles Avengers players
Players of American football from Virginia
People from Nottoway County, Virginia
21st-century African-American sportspeople
20th-century African-American sportspeople